Svislach or Śvislač, is the administrative center of Svislach Raion, Grodno Region, Belarus.

Svislach or Śvislač, may also refer to the following places in Belarus:

Svislach (Berezina), a river in central Belarus, a tributary of Berezina
Svislach (Neman), a river in western Belarus, a tributary of Neman